Noah Harpster is an American actor, writer, producer and director.

He is best known for his role of Remy on Tig Notaro's One Mississippi, and writing, producing and acting on Transparent, for which he won a Peabody Award, and was nominated for an Emmy Award, Writers Guild Award, Golden Globe Award, and GLAAD Award.

Since 2019 he plays NASA Mission Controller Bill Strausser in the Apple TV+ alternate history series For All Mankind, created by Ronald D. Moore, Matt Wolpert and Ben Nedivi.

He and his writing partner Micah Fitzerman-Blue wrote the script for A Beautiful Day in the Neighborhood about Fred Rogers which landed on the Black List in 2013. After a nearly 10-year process, it was released in 2019, starring Tom Hanks, Chris Cooper, Matthew Rhys, and Harpster himself in a small role. For their screenplay, Fitzerman-Blue and Harpster were nominated for  also winners of the prestigious PEN Award and the Humanities Prize.

He and Fitzerman-Blue also co-wrote Maleficent: Mistress of Evil alongside Linda Woolverton.

In 2017, they opened their production company, Blue Harp., and in 2018, he and Fitzerman-Blue were listed on Varietys 10 Screenwriters to Watch.

In 2021, Harpster and Fitzerman-Blue created the limited series Painkiller for Netflix. It's a show about the birth of the opioid crisis and stars Matthew Broderick, Uzo Aduba, Taylor Kitsch, Dina Shihabi, and West Duchovony. It's based on the reporting work done by Barry Meier for the New York Times and Patrick Radden Keefe for the New Yorker. Harpster also has an acting role in the limited-series. It will be realized in 2022.

Along with Fitzerman-Blue, he will be co-directing the film adaptation of Dash Shaw's Bottomless Belly Button in 2022.

Filmography

References

External links 
 

1976 births
Living people
21st-century American male writers
American male actors
American film directors
American male screenwriters
English-language film directors
21st-century American screenwriters